Orange Prince (1984) is a painting by American artist Andy Warhol, of Prince, the American singer, songwriter, record producer, multi-instrumentalist, actor, and director. The painting is one of twelve silkscreen portraits on canvas of Prince created by Warhol in 1984. These paintings and four additional works on paper are collectively known as the Prince Series. Each painting is unique and can be distinguished by colour.

Orange Prince (1984) is considered an important late work referencing Warhol's portraits from the early 1960s, of movie stars and celebrity icons, such as Marilyn Monroe, Elizabeth Taylor and Jacqueline Kennedy. Art historian and Warhol expert Thomas E. Crow believes that Warhol's portrait of Prince shows much greater freedom of expression, as in the early portraits. This is especially evident when compared to Warhol's more 'factory-line' style of portraits from the 1970s onwards, which were mainly commissions.

The Warhol portraits were not commissioned by Prince, but rather were made by Warhol for his private collection. Crow believes Warhol was fascinated by Prince, a young star not in Warhol's direct circle. He says that Warhol was drawn to Prince's edgy image, which acted as inspiration for the art work:"(Warhol's) evident fascination with Prince, known for sexual frankness in his music and an androgynous style in his clothes, make-up, and hairstyle, echoed similar traits among those he famously gathered around himself in the Factory entourage of the 1960s."

Composition 
Orange Prince (1984) takes inspiration from a black and white photograph by Lynn Goldsmith as its source image, depicting Prince in a full length pose during the burgeoning stages of his career in 1981. The magazine Vanity Fair, a Condé Nast publication, originally licensed the photograph from Goldsmith's agency, agreeing that the photograph would be used as an "artistic reference". Vanity Fair then commissioned Warhol, who created a cropped, highly colorized painting using just Prince's head from the photograph. Warhol's painting was then used for an article in the November 1984 issue of Vanity Fair, entitled "Purple Fame". Goldsmith received a co-credit for the illustration in the magazine. Warhol then created 15 other variants of the Prince portrait for his private collection, which became collectively known as the Prince Series; these variants were neither commissioned by Goldsmith, Vanity Fair, Condé Nast, nor Prince himself.

The composition of Orange Prince (1984) makes direct reference to the portraits Warhol produced in the 1960s, as Crow points out in his 2018 analysis of the painting. Crow likens the composition to Warhol's Marilyn Series where the subject's head 'floats' in day-glo color. According to Crow, the composition is distinct from other late portraits, the majority of which were commissions and followed a commercial formula, such as Warhol's portrait of Michael Jackson which was commissioned and created a few months before Orange Prince (1984). As Crow says: "Warhol's 1984 portraits (of Prince) ... harked back to the independently conceived celebrity likenesses of his earlier career (from the 1960s). As Prince had not commissioned any of the paintings, Warhol could experiment with far more variations in background patterns and colors."The face of the subject is depicted in a neon orange color, the same as the background. The facial outline, features and hair are in black. Highlights of green and blue are woven onto the screen amongst the black line around the subject's facial features, hair and ears. The overall effect is to make the subject luminesce, with a trade-mark Warhol flatness to the image, due partly to the very little graduation of shading.

Prince and Andy Warhol 
Prince and Andy Warhol were personally acquainted, as Warhol's diary entries show.

On a number of occasions in the early 1980s Prince had appeared in Andy Warhol's Interview Magazine. In the April 1980 edition Prince appears in a full-page photograph by Robert Mapplethorpe.

Warhol attended a number of Prince concerts in the 1980s, including one of the very earliest in New York. On December 9, 1980, Prince played The Ritz in New York as part of his Dirty Mind Tour. The club was only half-full, but as music critic Nik Cohn reported, "Andy Warhol and his claque showed up, and so did a number of music-biz faces. Before the show, they lounged in poses of practised cool. Then Prince appeared, and cool went up in flames".

In the December 1981 edition of Warhol's Interview magazine Prince appears in a controversial image showing him in the shower, and a crucifix on the wall behind.

In Fall 1984, Warhol created Orange Prince (1984). Prince had released the Purple Rain album and movie that year and was well known internationally.

On August 2, 1986, Warhol was in the front row at Prince's concert at Madison Square Garden. In his diary entry of their meeting, Warhol described sitting down at the concert "...just as Prince jumps out naked, or almost, and it's the greatest concert I've ever seen there, just so much energy and excitement."

Afterwards at the New York dance club, The Palladium, Warhol reported that he was very excited to be invited to an after-party hosted by Prince, and fascinated by him. Warhol described arriving at the party and seeing Prince appear in the near-empty club "...in a white coat and pink bellbottoms, like a Puerto Rican at a prom, all by himself". He also stated Prince was a gracious host who remembered the names of the many individuals in Warhol's entourage that night, and how Prince made sure he danced with everyone.

Billy Idol was at the same party; seeing Prince and Idol together, Warhol observed that "Hollywood glamour girls" such as Jean Harlow and Marilyn Monroe had been supplanted by "glamour boys" such as Prince and Idol—a development that Warhol found completely fascinating and "...so weird".

That night, Prince agreed to appear on the December 1986 cover of Warhol's Interview magazine, which Warhol described in his diary:"We asked Prince if he would be our December cover and he said we'd have to talk to his manager and we said that we'd asked the manager and the manager said to ask him, and so they said they'd work it out. We were just shaking, it was so exciting."Warhol's portrait of Prince was created in 1984, two years before their post-concert meeting in 1986, and remained in Warhol's own collection until he died in 1987.

Technique 
Orange Prince (1984) was created using a complex tracing and silkscreening process, using layers of colors of silkscreen ink on top of a hand-painted orange ground of acrylic polymer paint, applied to canvas. The technique was popularised by Warhol, and is synonymous with the artist from the 1960s onwards, when he produced his early portraits of Marilyn Monroe, Elvis Presley, Elizabeth Taylor and Marlon Brando, and other Hollywood movie stars and celebrities of the time.

The 1989 MoMA catalogue of Warhol's work, includes a comprehensive description of Warhol's silkscreening technique, provided by the British curator and author Marco Livingstone under the title, "Do It Yourself: Notes on Warhol's Technique."A pencil tracing was taken from the full sized [transparent] acetate prepared for the photographic screen. Either by transferring the penciled line by pressing onto the front of the acetate or sheet of paper, or by placing a sheet of carbon paper beneath the tracing and then drawing the line one section at a time, a rough guide was established for each color area, for example, the lips and the eyelids. The colors were then brushed on by hand, often with the use of masking tape to create a clean junction between them, with the eventual imposition of the black screened image also serving to obscure any unevenness in the line. The acetates were examined by Warhol before they were made into screens, so that he could indicate by means of instructions, written and drawn with china-marking crayon, any changes to be made: for example, to increase the tonal contrast by removing areas of half-tone, thereby flattening the image. The position of the image would be established by taping the four corners of the acetate to the canvas and then tearing off the tape along the corner edges of the acetate; the fragments of tape remaining on the canvas would serve as a guide in locating the screen on top. The position of the screen would be confirmed by eye, and it would then be printed.

Warhol's orange paintings 
A number of important silkscreen works by Andy Warhol use the color orange. Some of the first silkscreen works from the 1960s use orange as the dominant color, and Warhol continued to use orange in his paintings throughout his lifetime. Orange Prince shares a compositional style to Orange Marilyn (1962). A number of orange paintings by Warhol are in museum collections around the world:

 Shot Orange Marilyn, 1964 (40 in x 40 in).
 Orange Car Crash Fourteen Times, 1963.
 Orange Disaster #5 1963. 
 Orange Car Crash (5 Deaths 11 Times in Orange) (Orange Disaster), 1963.
 5 Deaths on Orange (Orange Disaster), 1963.
 Orange Little Electric Chair, 1964.
 Marilyn Diptych, 1962
 Orange Marilyn (1962) (20 in x 16 in).
The effect of bright colors in Warhol's work is to draw renewed focus to the subject matter. In the Death and Disaster series of paintings the graphic images Warhol took from tabloid newspaper stories of the time are a stark counterpoint to the candy-color palette. Another example of this is Twelve Electric Chairs from 1964, which consists of twelve highly contrasting colored images of the electric chair, including Orange Little Electric Chair, 1964.

In late 2017, a leading art industry newsletter, Baer Faxt, reported that Warhol's Orange Marilyn (1962) sold in a private transaction for $250 million

Prince's favorite color was orange 
In 2017 Prince's sister, Tyka Nelson, said that Prince's favorite color was orange, and not purple, as had been widely assumed. She also mentioned that Prince often wore all-orange stage outfits, had orange sets for concerts and that his favorite item was his custom-built orange Cloud guitar.

Modern-day icon 
Art historian, Thomas Crow, believes Warhol depicts Prince as a "modern-day icon" in his painting, referencing religious iconographic paintings: "[Warhol's portraits of Prince] returned Warhol to the origins of his art-critical credibility, that is, the flattened, emblematic, minimally descriptive manner that had characterized his first, definitive phase as an artist."Marilyn Diptych, 1962, is an early example of iconography in Warhol's work, the image repeated many times to emphasise the ubiquity of celebrity and references a form of religious painting in its title.

The Marilyn "Flavors" portraits – thirteen unique paintings of Marilyn Monroe with different color backgrounds – are also amongst the first examples of Warhol's iconographic style, and graphic use of saturated block color, held by art historians to highlight a manufactured celebrity. Art historian Robert Rosenblum was personally close to Warhol and wrote about Warhol's Catholic religious observance, which informed Rosenblum's observation about the 1962 Gold Marilyn in the collection of the Museum of Modern Art: "When Warhol took a photographic silkscreen of Marilyn Monroe's head, set it on gold paint, and let it float high in a timeless, spaceless heaven ..., he was creating, in effect, a secular saint for the 1960s that might well command as much earthly awe and veneration as, say, a Byzantine Madonna hovering for eternity on a gold mosaic ground."Geralyn Huxley, curator of film and video at the Andy Warhol Museum in Pittsburgh, believes Warhol's preoccupation with celebrity portraits and the style in which he depicts them, stems from the artist's religious upbringing. As a child Warhol attended a local Catholic church which featured an iconostasis, a screen situated in front of the altar featuring large-scale depictions of the faces of the Saints.

Art historian Jane Daggett Dillenberger, in her book The Religious Art of Andy Warhol, points out that Warhol's portraits of celebrities have a strong affinity with the sacred icons at the St. John Chrysostom Byzantine Catholic Church in Pittsburgh: "Andy's earliest experience of art was of religious art ... for Andy, art and religion were linked."In his New York Times review of the 1989 Warhol retrospective exhibition at MoMA, art critic Michael Brenson says that Warhol's portraits, at their best, bring together diametrically opposite values, such as sensual excess and the purity of an icon, as seen in the portrait of Prince:"[Andy Warhol's] flat images, painted in a flat tone, existing in a non-space from which past and future have been banished ... make the present seem absolute and eternal—in other words, transcendent. Part of Warhol's achievement was to legitimize his love of secular, profane subjects by attaching to them traditional religious values. ... Warhol argues that self-effacement and sensual excess, purity and trash, the moment and eternity can exist together."

Publications 
Orange Prince (1984) painting has been reproduced in books, magazines and other media, most notably as the cover of a commemorative magazine published by Condé Nast just after Prince's death in 2016.

The Genius of Prince
Orange Prince (1984) was reproduced on the front cover of The Genius of Prince, a commemorative magazine published in the wake of the musician's sudden death just months before. The US collector's edition was published by Condé Nast in June 2016 and distributed internationally.

Vanity Fair 
Featured in both the November 1984 and the April 2016 editions of Vanity Fair, reproduced in color on a full page to illustrate the article entitled Purple Fame, about Prince's rise to fame in the wake of his celebrated 1984 album and movie Purple Rain, the inspiration for Warhol's portrait.

The Vanity Fair article claims that Warhol's portrait of Prince captures the recording artist "...at the height of his powers" and is one of the first global pieces written as a critical appreciation of the musician, coinciding with the start of the recording artist's 98-date Purple Rain Tour. Purple Rain is frequently regarded as Prince's magnum opus; declaring that Prince had "...finally arrived", and Warhol's portrait shows Prince as a confident and celebrated musician, now on a world stage and internationally renowned.

Andy Warhol: The Complete Commissioned Magazine Work 
Published in 2014 by Prestel Verlag, written and edited by Paul Marechal.

Andy Warhol Treasures 
Published in 2009 by Goodman/Carlton Books, written and edited by Matt Wrbican and Geralyn Huxley.

Warhol Live 
Published in 2008 by Prestel Publishing by Stephane Aquin.

Andy Warhol Portraits 
Published by Phaidon in 2007, written and edited by Tony Shafrazi.

Andy Warhol Prints: A Catalogue Raisonne 1962 – 1987 
The fourth edition of was published in 2003 by D.A.P., edited by Frayda Feldman and Jörg Schellmann.

Andy Warhol Portraits 
Published in 1993 by Thames and Hudson Ltd., written and edited by Henry Geldzahler and Robert Rosenblum.

International press 
Orange Prince (1984) and other works from the Prince Series have been widely written about, featured and illustrated in a broad array of newspapers, magazines and online publications across the globe, most notabaly, The New York Times, Artnet, The Washington Post, Smithsonian and Artforum.

Exhibitions 
Works from the Prince Series have been widely exhibited at major galleries and art institutions around the world, which include:

2019 
Andy Warhol: Portraits - McNay Art Museum, San Antonio, TX.

2015 
Andy Warhol: Portraits - The Phoenix Art Museum, Phoenix, Arizona.

2010 
Andy Warhol: Portraits - The Andy Warhol Museum, Pennsylvania.

2009–2011 
Warhol Live - The Montreal Museum of Fine Arts in Montreal, Canada; Andy Warhol Museum in Pittsburgh, PA; The Frist Center for the Visual Arts in Nashville, Tennessee; and the de Young Museum in San Francisco, CA.

A touring exhibition of the artist's work as seen through the lens of music, taken from the collection of the Andy Warhol Museum. The exhibition further toured North America and Europe.

2008 
Andy Warhol's Celebrities - Coskun Fine Art in London.

2005 
Tony Shafrazi Gallery in New York City.

1993 
Andy Warhol: Portraits of the Seventies and Eighties - Museum of Contemporary Art Australia in Sydney, and in the Anthony d’Offay Gallery in London.

Provenance 
Orange Prince (1984) is owned by a private British collector. It was previously in the personal collection of Andy Warhol, with the other Prince Series works, then via his estate to the Andy Warhol Foundation.

Legal issues 

As noted above, Warhol primarily created the portraits in the Prince Series for his private collection. Other than the original portrait published in the November 1984 issue of Vanity Fair, the Prince Series was not commissioned by either the magazine, its parent company Condé Nast, the original photographer of the source image Lynn Goldsmith, or Prince himself. After Prince's death in 2016, Condé Nast published its commemorative magazine with one of the Prince Series variants as the cover image. Despite originally licensing the photograph and the co-credit in Vanity Fair back in 1984, Goldsmith alleged that she had been unaware of the existence of the illustration and the Prince Series until 2016, over 30 years later when she saw the Condé Nast cover. Furthermore, Condé Nast only credited the Andy Warhol Foundation in the 2016 magazine and did not mention her.

Goldsmith informed the Foundation that she believed these additional works were copyright violations of her photograph and stated her intent to seek legal action. The Foundation first filed for a preliminary ruling in the U.S. Southern District Court of New York, which then ruled in 2019 that Warhol had transformed Goldsmith's original photograph under fair use. Goldsmith then appealed to the Second Circuit Court of Appeals, which ruled in her favor in 2021. The Foundation then appealed to the U.S Supreme Court; in March 2022 the U.S. Supreme Court granted the Foundation's petition for writ of certiorari to determine the nature and definition of transformative use, to be heard in their 2022-23 term. On 12 October 2022, the Supreme Court heard the case in oral argument.

References 

1984 paintings
Paintings by Andy Warhol
Prince (musician)
Pop art
Portrait art
Black people in art
Cultural depictions of American men
Cultural depictions of rock musicians
Cultural depictions of pop musicians